Aragon Dam is an irrigation dam in Davao Oriental, Philippines. The current dam was completed within just seven months although initial development started in 2012 was disrupted by Typhoons Bopha and Lingling (local names: Pablo and Agaton). The dam is part of the Cateel Irrigation Project, the biggest project by the Mindanao Rural Development Project, both in physical and financial terms, costing about ₱281 million. The dam is expected to provide irrigation to over 1,600 hectares of rice fields spanning eleven barangays of Cateel.

References

Dams in the Philippines
Dams completed in 2014
Buildings and structures in Davao Oriental
2014 establishments in the Philippines
Gravity dams